Charles Regnault was a 17th-century French writer and playwright. He wrote Marie Stuard, reyne d'Ecosse, a play about Mary, Queen of Scots given in 1637 and printed in 1639.

Works 
1637: Marie Stuard, reyne d'Ecosse
1641: Les métamorphoses françoises
1642: Blanche de Bourbon, reyne d'Espagne: tragi-comédie
1639: Stances (with Jean de Rotrou and Poucet de Montauban)

References

17th-century French male writers
17th-century French dramatists and playwrights